Ottawa is a suburb in Durban, KwaZulu-Natal, South Africa, neighbouring Verulam. Allegedly it was named after the founder's daughter during the early 1900s.

References

Suburbs of Durban